Julie Dawall Jakobsen (born 25 March 1998) is a Danish badminton player. She won gold medals in the girls' doubles at the 2015 European Junior Championships and in the girls' singles event in 2017.

Achievements

European Junior Championships 
Girls' singles

Girls' doubles

BWF International Challenge/Series (7 titles, 5 runners-up) 
Women's singles

Women's doubles

  BWF International Challenge tournament
  BWF International Series tournament
  BWF Future Series tournament

References

External links 

 

1998 births
Living people
Sportspeople from Copenhagen
Danish female badminton players